Ballers is the second studio album by  American hip hop  group, 504 Boyz. It was released on December 10, 2002, through The New No Limit and was produced by Donald XL Robertson with additional production by newcomer Todd Moultrie on the reggae influenced My Life is Sweet. The album peaked at number 49 on the Billboard 200 and  number 13 on the Top R&B/Hip-Hop Albums chart.

The members that perform on this album include Master P, Silkk The Shocker, Magic, Krazy, Choppa, T-Bo and Curren$y.

Track listing

Charts

Weekly charts

Year-end charts

References 

2002 albums
504 Boyz albums
No Limit Records albums